A silicon compiler is a software system that takes a user's specifications and automatically generates an integrated circuit (IC). The process is sometimes referred to as hardware compilation.

Silicon compilation takes place in three major steps:
 Convert a hardware-description language such as Verilog or VHDL into logic (typically in the form of a "netlist").
 Place equivalent logic gates on the IC.  Silicon compilers typically use standard-cell libraries so that they do not have to worry about the actual integrated-circuit layout and can focus on the placement.
 Routing the standard cells together to form the desired logic.

Silicon compilation was first described in 1979 by David L. Johannsen, under the guidance of his thesis adviser, Carver Mead.

Johannsen, Mead, and Edmund K. Cheng subsequently founded Silicon Compilers Inc. (SCI) in 1981.

Edmund Cheng designed an Ethernet Data Link Controller chip in 1981–82 using structured design methodology, in order to drive the software and circuit-library development at SCI. The project went from concept to chip specification in 3 months, and from chip specification to tape-out in 5 months. Fabricated using a 3-micron NMOS process, the chip measured 50,600 square mils in die area, and was being marketed and manufactured in volume-production by 1983 under license from SCI.

John Wawrzynek at Caltech used some of the earliest silicon compilers in 1982 as part of the "Yet Another Processor Project" (YAPP).

In 1983–84, the SCI team designed and implemented the data-path chip used in the MicroVAX in seven months.
MicroVAX's data-path chip contains the entire 32-bit processor, except its microcode store and control-store sequencer, and contains 37,000 transistors.
At the time, chips with similar levels of complexity required about 3 years to design and implement.
Including those seven months, Digital Equipment Corporation completed the design and implementation of the MicroVAX within one year.

See also
 Electric (software)

References

External links
 Definition from PC Magazine
 Computer Aids for VLSI Design by Steven M. Rubin
 Hardware compilation information
 Hardware compilation mailing list

Electronic design automation
Computing terminology